Lavina may refer to:

 Lavina, California, former name of La Vina, California
 Lavina, Montana, United States
 Lavina, Rezzo, a village of Liguria, Italy
 Ferran Laviña, Spanish basketball player
 Lavina Fielding Anderson (born 1944), Latter Day Saint scholar, writer, editor, and feminist
 Lavina Dawson (born 1937), writer and stage producer; see A Christmas Held Captive
 The Czech name for the 1946 film The Avalanche

See also